Pablo Hernández may refer to:

 Pablo Hernández (footballer, born 1975), Uruguayan retired footballer
 Pablo Hernández (footballer, born 1985), Spanish footballer
 Pablo Hernández (footballer, born 1986), Chilean footballer
 Pablo Hernández (gymnast), Cuban gymnast
 Pablo Hernández (cyclist) (1940–2021), Colombian cyclist
 Pablo Franco Hernández (born 1963), Mexican lawyer and politician
 Pablo Hernández de Cos (born 1971), Spanish economist
 Yoan Pablo Hernández (born 1984), Cuban professional boxer